This is a list of Hungarian football transfers for the 2007–08 season. Only moves from the Borsodi Liga are listed.

Summer transfer window

May

References

Hungary
Transfer
2007–08